The Leontovich boundary condition is a boundary condition in classical electrodynamics that relates to the tangential components of the electric Et and magnetic Ht fields on the surface of well-conducting bodies.

Definition
As originally formulated by Russian physicist Mikhail Leontovich, the boundary condition is given as

This condition is accurate when the conductivity of the conductor is large, which is the case for most metals. More generally, for cases when the radii of curvature of the conducting surface is large with respect to the skin depth, the resulting fields on the interior can be well approximated by plane waves, thus giving rise to the Leontovitch condition.

Applications
The Leontovich boundary condition is useful in many scattering problems where one material is a metal with large (but finite) conductivity. As the condition provides a relationship between the electric and magnetic fields at the surface of the conductor, without knowledge of the fields within, the task of finding the total fields is considerably simplified.

References

Boundary conditions
Electrodynamics